The following is a list of notable events and releases of the year 1997 in Norwegian music.

Events

March
 21 – The 24th Vossajazz started in Voss, Norway (March 21 – 23).

May
 21 – The 25th Nattjazz started in Bergen, Norway (May 21 – 31).

June
 13 – The Norwegian Wood started in Oslo, Norway (June 13 – 15).
 28 – What should be the last Kalvøyafestivalen started at Kalvøya near by Oslo (June 28 – 29).

July
 12 – The 37th Moldejazz started in Molde, Norway (July 12 – 19).

Unknown date
 The band TINGeLING was initiated.

Albums released

Unknown date

K
 Olga Konkova
 Going With The Flow (Curling Legs), with Carl Morten Iversen and Audun Kleive

Deaths

 March
 23 — Arnljot Kjeldaas, composer and organist (born 1916).

 November
 30 – Alfred Næss, playwright and songwriter (born 1927).

 December
 10 — Karsten Andersen, orchestra conductor (born 1920).
 12 — Søren Gangfløt, organist and composer (born 1921).

Births

 August
 24 – Alan Walker, music producer and DJ.

See also
 1997 in Norway
 Music of Norway
 Norway in the Eurovision Song Contest 1997

References

 
Norwegian music
Norwegian
Music
1990s in Norwegian music